The 1932 UK & Ireland Greyhound Racing Year was the seventh year of greyhound racing in the United Kingdom and Ireland. The total annual attendance across the country for 1932 topped 20 Million, increasing to 20,178,260 from 17,906,917 (in 1931), a sixth consecutive annual increase.

Summary
At least 43 new tracks opened during 1932. It is believed that there were 187 tracks (including independent tracks) in operation by December 1932 as the industry continued to experience phenomenal growth. The breakdown consisted of 50 tracks affiliated to the National Greyhound Racing Society and 14 tracks affiliated the rival organisation the British Greyhound Tracks Control Society (BGTCS) leaving 123 unaffiliated tracks.

Tracks
The London area was served by four new tracks Crayford & Bexleyheath Stadium, Hackney Wick Stadium, Catford Stadium and Brixton Greyhound Stadium. Catford held an inaugural meeting on Saturday 30 July where the crowd witnessed a seven card race of events comprising four or five runners. Mick the Miller was paraded around the track prior to the fourth race. Edinburgh welcomed two new tracks, Stenhouse Stadium and Marine Gardens and Shawfield Stadium opened in Glasgow.

Plans were drawn up by the Blackpool Greyhound Syndicate, owners of Blackpool and Hanley, to put a track around the football and rugby pitch at Craven Park, Barrow-in-Furness. The syndicate sold it as an ambitious project that would give the Furness public its first taste of a sport that has become tremendously popular since its inauguration five years previously. Walter Aland, the managing director, was negotiating for the construction of greyhound tracks on football grounds in several parts of the country and was confident that it was possible to run a greyhound meeting on a football ground less than an hour after a match had finished. He said "Negotiations have already been completed for the introduction of greyhound racing to Barrow, Walsall and Coventry, and by June we hope to have tracks on 12 grounds, four of which will be in Lancashire". An application was to be made for a licence and facilities would be provided for private owners to enter dogs in races. Mr G Lumsden, was appointed general manager of all tracks under the control of the syndicate. The attempts to set up a track at Barrow met stiff opposition after being condemned by the clergymen claiming the plans as being an encouragement to gambling.

News
At Eastville Stadium the totalisator system was introduced at the same time that Brighton & Hove Greyhound Stadium installed their hand-operated tote, but within six months both tracks would suffer due to the government ban on tote betting. The government Cabinet Committee conducted a report into the totalisator on greyhound racing tracks. The committee chaired by Sir J. Gilmour and using an interim report from the Royal Commission on Lotteries and Betting recommended that the government should adopt a policy on totalisator betting at greyhound tracks. The Royal Commission findings highlighted the spread of organised facilities for betting and gambling and recommended that totalisator betting on the greyhound trade should come to an end as soon as possible. A recent court case (Shuttleworth v Leeds Greyhound Racing Association) was quoted whereby Leeds actions constituted an offence because of tote deductions from the winnings. The committee agreed that it should become illegal, despite the fact that horse racing could continue with the use of totalisator systems. In a similar case in Scotland (Strathern v Scottish Greyhound Racing Company) the court ruled that there was no offence committed against the Act of 1853.

The owner of Charlton Stadium (Thomas Murphy) died and had a memorial of two life sized greyhounds built on his grave in Charlton cemetery. Trainer Jock Hutchinson left Catford to be replaced by 1931 English Greyhound Derby winning owner Hammond. The Greyhound Express was launched giving readers the inside information to racing in London but it became so popular that the paper grew in size and was distributed throughout the country for the next 40 years.

Competitions
The hurdler Long Hop won the Grand National, Empire Stadium Hurdles and Wimbledon Challenge Trophy in the process of securing 16 consecutive wins. Future Cutlet returned to track racing and was expected to take over the mantle of leading greyhound following the retirement of Mick the Miller. The brindle won the Wembley Spring Cup but was quoted at 100-1 for the 1932 English Greyhound Derby which led to a surge in ante-post bets that left the bookmakers with huge liabilities on the dog. Following his Derby defeat Future Cutlet bounced back to his best winning a second successive Cesarewitch, a competition that included Seldom Led. Future Cutlet set a new world record of 33.78 sec in his semi-final.

The new Derby champion Wild Woolley switched from Jack Rimmer to Jimmy Campbell at Belle Vue Stadium and whilst winning the Northern Flat later that year he set a world record of 28.49 for 500 yards in the process. Jack's brother Jimmy Rimmer set a trainer's record of 504 winners in one year whilst attached to the Greenfield Stadium, Bradford.

The Laurels in September, drew a strong field with the final including Seldom Led and Scurry Gold Cup champion Experts Boast and a new star called Beef Cutlet (half-brother to Future Cutlet and full brother to Queen of the Suir). He had reached the last four of the Coursing National Breeders' Stakes at Powerstown in 1932 and was purchased from Mr J.A. Byrne, by Sir Herbert Merrett, chairman of Cardiff City Football Club as a present for his daughter, Miss Joan Merritt.  He made his debut on the track at Cardiff Arms Park, winning the Glamorgan Gold Cup and setting a new track record, in 28.41sec. His Waterhall kennels trainer John Hegarty would later become a Racing Manager. In only his seventh track race he won the Laurels, breaking the track record and setting a new world record for 500 yards recording 28.47. Derby finalists performed well throughout the year and Fret Not trained by Leslie Reynolds won the St Leger from 4-9 favourite Curious Mickey. The Oaks went to Queen of the Suir, the sister of the two Cutlets.

Ireland
Mullingar Greyhound Stadium opened on 16 August, just two weeks before a calendar of classic events was distributed by the Irish Coursing Club for the first time, on 2 August, it read as follows; St Leger at Celtic Park, National Sprint at Dunmore Park, National Derby at Shelbourne Park, Grand National at Harold's Cross Stadium and the Oaks at Clonmel Greyhound Stadium. Harold's Cross were left angered by the decision to run the National Derby at Shelbourne because they had run the unofficial National Derby since 1928. Creamery Border was purchased by butter maker Michael Collins as a puppy, together with his litter brother Sly Mover, for £30, a large sum taking into account the depression. The blue dog by Border Line out of Cook had suffered from distemper at 12 months old but was cured by Arthur 'Doc' Callanan. Six months later he made his debut coursing in the Cork Cup in which he was defeated in the semi-final by coursing legend White Sandills. At two years old he contested the Kingdom Cup at Ballybeggan Park, Tralee, a thirty-two-dog stake and went through the event undefeated which gained the attention of the London owners and syndicates.

Tracks opened

Roll of honour

Principal UK races

Key
U = unplaced
+ = Track record

References 

Greyhound racing in the United Kingdom
Greyhound racing in the Republic of Ireland
1932 in British sport
1932 in Irish sport
1932 in Welsh sport
1932 in Scottish sport